The Engineering & Technologies Academy (ETA) is a public engineering based magnet high school located at Theodore Roosevelt High School, in San Antonio, Texas. The Engineering and Technologies Academy has various engineering and science related curriculum such as manufacturing, communication graphics, principles of engineering, drafting and computer-Aided design, GIS, and information technologies. Students also have the ability to partake in off-campus internships related to various fields of engineering.

ETA was founded in 2004 by former director William Sturgis and former UTSA professor Richard Howe. ETA enrolled 97 freshman for 2009–2010. The majority of students at ETA participate in competitions in organizations such as FIRST, the Technology Student Association, and the University Interscholastic League. Some of the program's students are employed as interns at businesses such as Southwest Research Institute, Rackspace, and Zachry Construction Corporation.

See also
Krueger Middle School
Design and Technology Academy
Theodore Roosevelt High School
STEM Academy at Lee

External links
Engineering and Technologies Academy Website
Northeast Independent School District

North East Independent School District high schools
High schools in San Antonio
Magnet schools in Texas